A stone is a small piece of rock.

Stone may also refer to:

Unit of measurement
 Stone (unit), a measure of weight formerly used in various Germanic European countries and still commonly used in Great Britain and Ireland for measuring human body weight
 Stone (Chinese weight)

Materials and minerals
 Building stone, a building material
 Dimension stone, stone fabricated to specific sizes or shapes
 Gemstone, an attractive mineral used for adornments
 Stoneware, a ceramic ware

Biology
 Calculus (medicine), a stone formed in the body, such as kidney stones or gallstones
 Pyrena, the hard seed-bearing kernel inside drupe fruits such as peaches and olives

Geography

England
 Stone, Buckinghamshire
 Stone, Gloucestershire
Stone, South Yorkshire
 Stone, Staffordshire
 Stone (UK Parliament constituency) in Staffordshire
 Stone, Worcestershire
 Kent
 Norton, Buckland and Stone
 Stone, Kent
 Stone in Oxney

United States
Stone, Indiana
Stone, Kentucky
Stone, Wisconsin
Stone County (disambiguation)

People
 Stone (singer), the stage name of French singer and actress Annie Gautrat, solo and part of duo Stone et Charden
 Stone (surname), people with the surname Stone
 Stone Forsythe (born 1997), American football player
 Stone Gossard, an American rock musician
 Stone Hallquist (1902-1981), American football running back
 Stone Johnson (1940-1963), Olympic sprinting athlete, American football kick returner and running back
 Stone Librande (born 1972), American video game designer at Riot Games
 Stone Phillips, an American news anchor
 Stone Smartt (born 1998), American football player

Art, entertainment, and media

Comics
 Stone (manga)
 Dr. Stone, a manga by Riichiro Inagaki

Film and television
 Stone (1974 film), an Australian action-adventure
 Stone (2010 film), an American drama
 Stone (2012 film), a Russian dramatic thriller
 Stone (TV series), an American crime-drama television series
 Stone Cates, a character from General Hospital played by Michael Sutton

Games and sport
 Curling stone, used in the sport of curling
 Stone skipping
 Objects used in the game of Go

Literature
 Stone (novel), a science fiction novel by Adam Roberts
 Stone trilogy, a novel series by Graham Edwards
 Stone (1971), a novel by Douglass Wallop
 "Stone", a 1979 short story by Edward Bryant

Music

Groups
 Stone (band), a thrash metal band from Finland

Albums

 Stone, an album by Crash Vegas
Stone, a 1997 EP by Unbelievable Truth

Songs
 "Stone" (Alice in Chains song), 2013
 "Stone" (Cyrus song), 2015 
 "Stone", by Prince Alla, 1991
 "Stone", by the Small Faces from First Step
 "Stone", by Stereophonics from Pull the Pin
 "Stone", by Kim Wilde from Close, 1988

Brands and companies
 SS-26 Stone, a ballistic missile system
 Stone Brewing Company
 Stones Bitter

Other uses
 Stone butch
 Stoner (drug user)
 Stoning (metalworking), using a stone to sharpen metal
 Stoning, a form of capital punishment

See also
 
 
 Justice Stone (disambiguation)
 The Stone (disambiguation)
 The Stones (disambiguation)
 Stoned (disambiguation)
 Stoner (disambiguation)
 Stones (disambiguation)
 Ston (disambiguation)
 Stonne, a French commune